The Higher Education Support Act 2003 (Cth) (HESA) is an Act of the Parliament of the Commonwealth of Australia which governs funding for universities in Australia. The Act determines categories of providers eligible for public funding, establishes the basis for providing public funding, codifies the existing aims of universities, and introduces measures to strengthen Australia’s knowledge base.

Higher education providers 
In order to participate in the National Competitive Grants Program, providers must be approved.  The Act defines three groups of institutions.

Table A 
Self accrediting bodies, eligible for all funding under the Act:
 Central Queensland University
 Charles Darwin University
 Charles Sturt University
 Curtin University of Technology
 Deakin University
 Edith Cowan University
 Griffith University
 James Cook University
 La Trobe University
 Macquarie University
 Monash University
 Murdoch University
 Queensland University of Technology
 RMIT University
 Southern Cross University
 Swinburne University of Technology
 The Australian National University
 The Flinders University of South Australia
 The University of Adelaide
 The University of Melbourne
 The University of Queensland
 The University of Sydney
 The University of Western Australia
 University of Ballarat
 University of Canberra
 University of Newcastle
 University of New England
 University of New South Wales
 The University of Notre Dame Australia
 University of South Australia
 University of Southern Queensland
 University of Tasmania
 University of Technology, Sydney
 University of the Sunshine Coast
 University of Western Sydney
 University of Wollongong
 Victoria University of Technology
 Australian Catholic University
 Australian Maritime College
 Batchelor Institute of Indigenous Tertiary Education

Table B 
Self accrediting bodies, not eligible for general Commonwealth funded places. They are eligible for Commonwealth research funding and can be allocated national priority student places in fields such as nursing and education.
 Bond University
 University of Divinity
 Torrens University

Table C 
Providers approved by the Minister. These can be a university, an institution established with the powers to approve its own courses, or a provider whose courses have been accredited by the relevant State or Territory authority. They can be allocated national priority student places in fields such as nursing and education.
 Carnegie Mellon University, a non-profit organisation established under Pennsylvania law.
 University College London, a non-profit organisation established under United Kingdom law

Job-Ready Graduates Package 
In late 2020, the Morrison Government passed an amendment to the Act; the Higher Education Support Amendment (Job-Ready Graduates and Supporting Regional and Remote Students) Act 2020. The amendment changed the rates of private and public funding for different disciplines, while adding new Commonwealth Supported Places. The reforms were intended to drive greater enrolment growth in sectors where the Government anticipated greater jobs growth and opportunities, allow greater enrolment growth in regional areas, and add capacity in the system to account for population growth.

Professor in the Practice of Higher Education Policy at ANU, Andrew Norton highlighted three key flaws in the legislation; changes to student contributions won’t change student preferences, the new overall funding rates weaken university incentives, and the new Commonwealth contribution rates actually limit enrolment growth in the priority courses.

See also 
 Tertiary education in Australia
 List of universities in Australia

References

External links 
 Higher Education Support Act

Acts of the Parliament of Australia
Education policy in Australia
Student financial aid
2003 in Australian law
2003 in education
Higher education law
Higher education in Australia